This article lists the winners and nominees for the Billboard Music Award for Top Dance/Electronic Song. Eminent winners include LMFAO, MØ, Avicii, and Baauer.

Winners and nominees

2011 – 2013: Top Dance Song2013 – 2013: Top EDM Song2014 – present: Top Dance/Electronic Song

Artists with multiple wins and nominations

2 wins
 Baauer
 The Chainsmokers
 DJ Snake

5 nominations
 Calvin Harris
 DJ Snake
 Lady Gaga

4 nominations
 The Chainsmokers
 David Guetta
 Zedd

3 nominations
 Justin Bieber

2 nominations
 Ariana Grande
 Baauer
 Clean Bandit
 Diplo
 Dua Lipa
 Kygo
 LMFAO
 Marshmello
 Nicki Minaj
 Rihanna
 Selena Gomez
 Sia

References

Billboard awards